The 2022 Women's Caribbean Premier League, known for sponsorship reasons as the Massy WCPL 2022,  was the inaugural edition of the Women's Caribbean Premier League, a domestic Twenty20 women's cricket tournament played in the West Indies. The tournament took place from 31 August to 4 September 2022, with all matches played in Saint Kitts. The tournament was preceded by a T10 tournament, known as The 6ixty. The tournament was won by Trinbago Knight Riders.

Background
On 14 March 2022, Cricket West Indies announced their intention to hold the first Women's Caribbean Premier League, to run alongside the men's tournament, which began in 2013. The announcement followed a T10 women's tournament taking place ahead of the 2019 Caribbean Premier League final, with two teams playing two matches against each other.

The men's and women's tournaments are taking place during the same month-long window, between 30 August and 30 September 2022. The three teams that are taking part in the tournament were also announced in March 2022, each aligning with a men's team: Barbados Royals, Guyana Amazon Warriors and Trinbago Knight Riders. On 16 June 2022, the West Indian players playing for each team were confirmed, alongside confirmation that the tournament will take place in Saint Kitts. On 22 June 2022, it was announced that a T10 tournament would precede both the men's and women's tournaments, from 24 to 28 August, known as The 6ixty and involving all of the teams competing in the main tournament. On 16 August 2022, the overseas players playing for each team were confirmed.

Competition format
The three teams played each other side once, therefore playing two matches apiece. Matches were played using a Twenty20 format. The top two teams in the group advanced to the final.

The league worked on a points system with positions being based on the total points. Points were awarded as follows:

Win: 2 points. 
Tie: 1 point. 
Loss: 0 points.
Abandoned/No Result: 1 point.

Squads
The eleven West Indian players for each team were announced on 16 June 2022, with three additional overseas players per team announced on 16 August 2022.

Points table

Fixtures
Source: CPL T20

Group stage

Final

Statistics

Most runs

Source: CricketArchive

Most wickets

Source: CricketArchive

References

Women's Caribbean Premier League
2022 in West Indian cricket